Jack McDonald (1 September 1921 – December 1999) was an English footballer, who played as a full back in the Football League for Tranmere Rovers.

References

External links

1921 births
1999 deaths
Footballers from Liverpool
Tranmere Rovers F.C. players
Liverpool F.C. players
Association football fullbacks
English Football League players
English footballers
Wigan Athletic F.C. players